Nathan Löb David Zimmer (28 January 1830, Fürth – 10 June 1895, London) was a Bavarian-born English businessman, scholar, and Kabbalist.

Born in Bavaria into a pious Jewish family, Zimmer immigrated to England in about 1850 and entered business as an importer of toys and fancy goods. He was primarily engrossed with the study of Halakha, however, and especially with the more esoteric commentaries. His knowledge of the Kabbalah, and especially of gematria, was profound, and astronomical calculations also had a strong attraction for him.

Zimmer compiled an elaborate genealogical table of the Chief Rabbis of the United Kingdom, and was a frequent contributor to the Jewish periodical press on questions of astronomical calculation and of ritual. He was one of the original founders of the Federation of Synagogues.

The character of Froom Karlkammer in Israel Zangwill's Children of the Ghetto is said to have been based on Zimmer.

References
 

1831 births
1895 deaths
Kabbalists
19th-century British Jews
19th-century Jewish biblical scholars
People from Fürth
Writers from Bavaria
German emigrants to England
English people of German-Jewish descent
19th-century mystics
Numerologists